Arnold Ale (born June 17, 1970) is a former American football linebacker. He played for the Kansas City Chiefs in 1994 and for the San Diego Chargers in 1996.

References

1970 births
Living people
American football linebackers
Notre Dame Fighting Irish football players
UCLA Bruins football players
Kansas City Chiefs players
San Diego Chargers players